The London Olympic Games and Paralympic Games Act 2006 (c 12) is an Act of the Parliament of the United Kingdom. It was passed following the decision of the International Olympic Committee to stage the 2012 Olympic Games in London.  It is intended to facilitate the organisation of the Games, and to aid the UK in compliance with its responsibilities and obligations.

Provisions

The Act contains four main provisions: the establishing of the Olympic Delivery Authority, responsible for organising the games, the creation of an Olympic Transport Plan for the games, the regulation of advertising near the Games by the Secretary of State, and the regulation of street trading near the Games, also by the Secretary of State.

Olympic Delivery Authority

The Act creates the Olympic Delivery Authority to prepare for the Games, and gives it various abilities, such as: acquiring, owning and disposing of lands, entering into contracts, and applying for planning permission.  It also has some powers under the Local Government, Planning and Land Act 1980.

Section 10 - Olympic Transport Plan

The Olympic Delivery Authority is required by the Act to draw up a plan for transport for the Games, having consulted with various interested parties.  Once the plan has been drawn up, various parties are required to co-operate with it, including the local highway authority, local street authority and local traffic authorities concerned, who can ultimately be compelled by the Secretary of State to do so.

Advertising and street trading regulation

The Act grants to the Secretary of State the power to regulate advertising and street trading (trading on a highway or other public place) in the vicinity of Olympic events as he or she sees fit, violations of which regulations are punishable by a fine.

3(1)For the purpose of considering whether a person has infringed the London Olympics association right a court may, in particular, take account of his use of a combination of expressions of a kind specified in sub-paragraph (2).
(2)The combinations referred to in sub-paragraph (1) are combinations of— (a)any of the expressions in the first group, with (b)any of the expressions in the second group or any of the other expressions in the first group.

(3)The following expressions form the first group for the purposes of sub-paragraph (2)— “games”, Two Thousand and Twelve” “2012” and “twenty twelve”.

(4)The following expressions form the second group for the purposes of sub-paragraph (2)— gold, silver, bronze, London, medals, sponsor, and summer.

Section 40 - Commencement and duration
The following orders have been made under this section:
The London Olympic Games and Paralympic Games Act 2006 (Commencement No. 1) Order 2006 (S.I. 2006/1118 (C. 38))
The London Olympic Games and Paralympic Games Act 2006 (Commencement No. 2) Order 2007 (S.I. 2007/1064 (C. 44))
The London Olympic Games and Paralympic Games Act 2006 (Commencement No. 3) Order 2009 (S.I. 2009/2577 (C. 111))
The London Olympic Games and Paralympic Games Act 2006 (Commencement) (Scotland) Order 2006 (S.S.I. 2006/611 (C. 47))

References
Halsbury's Statutes,

External links

UK Legislation

Explanatory notes to the London Olympic Games and Paralympic Games Act 2006.

United Kingdom Acts of Parliament 2006
2006 sports events in London
2012 Summer Olympics
2012 Summer Paralympics
Acts of the Parliament of the United Kingdom concerning London